Klotho may refer to

 Clotho, one of the Moirai, or Fates, in Greek mythology
 97 Klotho, an asteroid
 Klotho (biology), a membrane protein
 Clotho (software), a software suite for synthetic biology.
 Clotho (Arrowverse), a fictional character